Gorno Tateši is a village in the municipality of Struga, North Macedonia.

Name
The name of the village is an Albanian toponym and derived possibly from a personal name.

Demographics
As of the 2021 census, Gorno Tateši had 619 residents with the following ethnic composition:
Albanians 601
Persons for whom data are taken from administrative sources 15
Others 2
Macedonians 1

According to the 2002 census, the village had a total of 1148 inhabitants. Ethnic groups in the village include:

Albanians 1144
Macedonians 1
Vlachs 1
Others 2

References

External links

Villages in Struga Municipality
Albanian communities in North Macedonia